Cotoneaster cochleatus, the Yunnan cotoneaster, is a species of flowering plant in the family Rosaceae. It is native to rocky slopes in Tibet, Sichuan, and Yunnan in China, and it has been introduced to the United Kingdom, Belgium and New York State. Its specific epithet cochleatus refers to its twisting stem.

The Centre for Agriculture and Bioscience International lists it in its Invasive Species Compendium. With its small glossy leaves, tiny rose-like flowers, showy red fruit, and low growth habit, it has found use in bonsai.

References

cochleatus
Ornamental plants
Plants used in bonsai
Endemic flora of China
Flora of Tibet
Flora of Sichuan
Flora of Yunnan
Plants described in 1957